John Forbes (12 July 1931 – 24 February 2017) was a South African cricketer. He played in two first-class matches for Border in 1952/53.

See also
 List of Border representative cricketers

References

External links
 

1931 births
2017 deaths
South African cricketers
Border cricketers
Cricketers from East London, Eastern Cape